Campo Grande is an elevated interchange station on the Yellow and Green Lines of the Lisbon Metro. It has a large bus terminal at ground level and is located on Rua Cipriano Dourado just north of Avenida General Norton de Matos in the Lisbon parish of Campo Grande.

Location
The station adjoins Estádio José Alvalade home of Sporting Clube de Portugal. Nearby destinations include Pimenta Palace, Rafael Bordalo Pinheiro Museum, Universidade Lusófona and northern access to the Faculty of Sciences, University of Lisbon.

History
The station opened on 1 April 1993. 

The architectural design is by Ezequiel Nicolau with murals and art installations by Eduardo Nery. The station is not fully accessible for people with physical disabilities.

Connections

Urban buses

Carris 
 207 Cais do Sodré ⇄ Fetais (morning service)
 701 Campo Grande (Metro) ⇄ Campo de Ourique (Prazeres)
 717 Praça do Chile ⇄ Fetais
 736 Cais do Sodré ⇄ Odivelas (Bairro Dr. Lima Pimentel)
 747 Campo Grande (Metro) ⇄ Pontinha (Metro)
 750 Estação Oriente (Interface) ⇄ Algés
 767 Campo Mártires da Pátria ⇄ Reboleira (Metro)
 778 Campo Grande (Metro) ⇄ Paço do Lumiar
 796 Campo Grande (Metro) ⇄ Galinheiras
 798 Campo Grande (Metro) ⇄ Galinheiras

Suburban buses

Rodoviária de Lisboa 
 201 Campo Grande (Metro) ⇄ Caneças (Escola Secundária)
 300 Campo Grande (Metro) ⇄ Sacavém (Praça da República)
 311 Campo Grande (Metro) ⇄ Bairro das Coroas (Alto do Moinho)
 312 Campo Grande (Metro) circulação via Charneca
 313 Campo Grande (Metro) circulação via Sacavém
 315 Campo Grande (Metro) circulação via Bairro da Bogalheira
 329 Campo Grande (Metro) ⇄ Quinta da Piedade
 331 Campo Grande (Metro) ⇄ Bucelas
 333 Campo Grande (Metro) ⇄ Zambujal
 334 Campo Grande (Metro) ⇄ Infantado
 335 Campo Grande (Metro) ⇄ Bucelas via Fanhões
 336 Campo Grande (Metro) ⇄ Bucelas via Ribas
 337 Campo Grande (Metro) ⇄ Tojal
 344 Campo Grande (Metro) ⇄ Bucelas
 353 Campo Grande (Metro) ⇄ Vialonga (Quinta da Maranhota)
 354 Campo Grande (Metro) ⇄ Vialonga (Quinta da Maranhota via Infantado
 901 Campo Grande (Metro) ⇄ Caneças (Escola Secundária)
 931 Campo Grande (Metro) ⇄ Pontinha (Metro) via Centro Comercial

See also
 List of Lisbon metro stations

References

External links

Green Line (Lisbon Metro) stations
Yellow Line (Lisbon Metro) stations
Railway stations opened in 1993